The Break is a 1963 British drama film directed by Lance Comfort and starring Tony Britton, William Lucas and Christina Gregg.

Plot
A dangerous prisoner escapes and then hides in a secluded hotel in Dartmoor from where he plans to flee to Argentina with his sister.

Cast

 Tony Britton as Greg Parker
 William Lucas as Jacko Thomas
 Eddie Byrne as Judd Tredgar
 Robert Urquhart as Pearson
 Sonia Dresdel as Sarah
 Edwin Richfield as Moses
 Gene Anderson as Jean Tredgar
 Christina Gregg as Sue Thomas
 Patrick Jordan as Driver
 John Junkin as Harry
 Marshall Jones as Jim

References

External links
 The Break on BFI website 
 

1963 films
British drama films
1963 drama films
1960s English-language films
1960s British films